Mining for Ruby is a 2017 American independent romantic drama film directed by Laura Zoe Quist and starring Antoinette Kalaj, Jonathan Bennett, Daniel Ponickly, Mischa Barton and Billy Zane.

Cast
Billy Zane as Professor Sam Goodwell
Mischa Barton as Jessica King
Jonathan Bennett as Andrew
Antoinette Kalaj as Ruby
Syd Wilder as Carla
Jessie Cohen as Alex
Jessica Rothert as Alex’s Friend
 Daniel Ponickly as Jack
Thom Van Dorp as Gun Store Clerk

Production
The film was shot in Fairbanks, Alaska.

References

External links
 
 

American romantic drama films
American independent films
Films shot in Alaska
2010s English-language films
2010s American films